The PL-12 (NATO reporting name: CH-AA-7) is an active radar-guided beyond-visual-range air-to-air missile developed by the People's Republic of China. It is considered comparable to the US AIM-120 AMRAAM and the Russian R-77.

History
Development of the PL-12 (SD-10) began in 1997. The first public information of the Leihua Electronic Technology Research Institute's PL-12 then called the SD-10 emerged in 2001. Development was assisted by Vympel NPO and Agat of Russia. Liang Xiaogeng is believed to have been the chief designer. Four successful test firings were made in 2004. The missile entered People's Liberation Army Air Force (PLAAF) service in 2005.

Design
The early batches of PL-12 missiles reportedly used the 9B-1348 radar seeker designed for the R-77 missile. The development process was assisted by Vympel NPO and Tactical Missile Corporation and benefited from Russian technology transfers. But as of 2018, the PL-12 was no longer reliant on Russian components for missile production.

The guidance system comprises data-linked mid-course guidance and active radar homing for terminal guidance. The missile uses Chinese rocket motor and airframe. The PL-12 may have a passive homing mode for use against jammers and AEW aircraft. The maximum range is estimated to be .

PL-12's overall dimension is larger than AIM-120 AMRAAM. Per PLAAF assessment, PL-12's capability sits between AIM-120B and AIM-120C, and the improved PL-12A is claimed to be comparable with the AIM-120C-4. According to the Royal United Services Institute, the range performance of PL-12 stands between AIM-120B and AIM-120C-5.

Variants

PL-12 Domestic version with 60 to 100 km range.
PL-12A NATO reporting name is CH-AA-7A. Improved PL-12 with a modified seeker and digital processor. Reportedly fitted with passive mode for anti-radiation missions.
SD-10A (ShanDian-10, 闪电-10) Export version of the PL-12.
SD-10B Enhanced SD-10A with better anti-jamming capability.

Operators

Current operators

 People's Liberation Army Air Force
 People's Liberation Army Naval Air Force

 Pakistan Air Force (PAF) - 575 delivered of 750 ordered 

Myanmar Air Force - 24 delivered of 60 ordered

See also
PL-15
AIM-120 AMRAAM
R-77
TC-2

References

Bibliography

</ref>

Air-to-air missiles of the People's Republic of China
Surface-to-air missiles of the People's Republic of China
Anti-radiation missiles of the People's Republic of China
Military equipment introduced in the 2000s